Timbaland is an American record producer, composer, rapper, and singer. He produced the album Ginuwine...the Bachelor for Ginuwine in 1996. He was later contacted by Aaliyah in 1996 to help produce her second album One in a Million, which went on to sell over 15 million copies worldwide. Timbaland released his first solo studio album, Tim's Bio: Life from da Bassment, in 1998. Two years later, in 2000, Timbaland produced several hit songs including Ludacris' "Rollout (My Business)", and contributed three singles to Aaliyah's self-titled third album. He collaborated with Nelly Furtado on Loose and with Justin Timberlake on FutureSex/LoveSounds in 2006. Timbaland released his second solo studio album, Timbaland Presents Shock Value, in 2007, and helped produce Madonna's twelfth studio album, Hard Candy, released in 2008.

Timbaland has received 21 Grammy Award nominations, winning four awards: one of them is for his collaboration with Timberlake on "SexyBack" in 2007, and another one for "LoveStoned", another collaboration with Timberlake, in 2008. Timbaland has also found success at the Teen Choice Awards, winning four awards from eight nominations. He won awards for both of his nominations in 2006, for "Choice Summer Track" and "Choice R&B/Hip-Hop Track" for the song "Promiscuous", a collaboration with Furtado. Overall, Timbaland has received fifteen awards from 39 nominations.

American Music Awards
The American Music Awards is an annual awards ceremony created by Dick Clark in 1973. Timbaland has received one nomination.

|-
|  || Timbaland || Favorite Pop/Rock Male Artist ||

American Society of Composers, Authors and Publishers
American Society of Composers, Authors and Publishers (ASCAP) is a non-profit performance rights organization that also holds a series of annual awards shows. Timbaland has received three awards.

|-
| 2001 || rowspan="3" align="center"|Timbaland || rowspan="3" align="center"|Songwriter of the Year || 
|-
| 2003 || 
|-
| 2008 ||

BET Awards 
The BET Awards is an annual awards show hosted by Black Entertainment Television. Timbaland has received one award.

BET Hip Hop Awards
The BET Hip Hop Awards is an annual awards show hosted by Black Entertainment Television. Timbaland  has received one award.

|-
| 2007 || Timbaland || Producer of the Year ||

BRIT Awards
The BRIT Awards are the British Phonographic Industry's not annual pop music awards. Timbaland has received one nomination.

|-
|  || Timbaland || Best International Male Solo Artist ||

Grammy Awards
The Grammy Awards are awarded annually by the National Academy of Recording Arts and Sciences of the United States. Timbaland has received 4 awards from 21 nominations.

|-
| 1998 
| Supa Dupa Fly (as producer)
| rowspan="2"|Best Rap Album
| 
|-
| 2000 
| Da Real World (as producer & engineer/mixer)
| 
|-
| 2002 
| "Get Ur Freak On" (as songwriter)
| Best R&B Song 
| 
|-
|rowspan="3"| 2004
| "Work It" (as songwriter)
| Best Rap Song 
| 
|-
| Under Construction (as producer)
| rowspan="4"|Album of the Year 
| 
|-
| Justified (as producer)
| 
|-
| 2005
| The Diary of Alicia Keys (as producer)
| 
|-
|rowspan="3"| 2007
| FutureSex/LoveSounds (as producer)
| 
|-
| "Promiscuous" 
| Best Pop Collaboration with Vocals 
| 
|-
| "Sexy Back" 
| rowspan="2"|Best Dance Recording 
| 
|-
|rowspan="5"| 2008
| "LoveStoned/I Think She Knows" 
| 
|-
| Timbaland 
| Producer of the Year, Non-Classical 
| 
|-
| "Ayo Technology" (as songwriter)
| Best Rap Song 
| 
|-
| "What Goes Around... Comes Around" 
| Record of the Year 
| 
|-
| "Give It to Me" (featuring Nelly Furtado & Justin Timberlake)
| rowspan="2"|Best Pop Collaboration with Vocals 
| 
|-
| 2009
| "4 Minutes" (with Madonna & Justin Timberlake)
| 
|-
|rowspan="2"| 2014 
| "Holy Grail" (as songwriter)
| Best Rap Song
| 
|-
| "Pusher Love Girl" (as songwriter)
| rowspan="2"|Best R&B Song
| 
|-
|rowspan="2"| 2015
| "Drunk in Love" (as songwriter)
| 
|-
| Beyoncé (as producer)
| Album of the Year
| 
|-
|2016 
| Empire: Season 1
| Best Compilation Soundtrack for Visual Media
| 
|-

Juno Awards
The Juno Awards is a Canadian awards ceremony presented annually by the Canadian Academy of Recording Arts and Sciences. Timbaland has received one nomination.

|-
| 2008 || Shock Value || International Album of the Year ||

MTV Australia Awards
The MTV Australia Awards is an annual awards ceremony established in 2005 by MTV Australia. Timbaland has received one award.

|-
| 2007 || "Sexyback" || Best Hook-Up ||

MTV Europe Music Awards
The MTV Europe Music Awards is an annual awards ceremony established in 1994 by MTV Europe. Timbaland has received one nomination.

|-
| 2007 || Timbaland || Ultimate Urban ||

MTV Video Music Awards
The MTV Video Music Awards is an annual awards ceremony established in 1984 by MTV. Timbaland has received four nominations.

|-
|rowspan="4"|  || "Sexyback" || Most Earthshattering Collaboration || 
|-
| "The Way I Are" || Monster Single of the Year || 
|-
|rowspan="2"| "Promiscuous" || Best Pop Video || 
|-
| Best Dance Video ||

People's Choice Awards
The People's Choice Awards is an awards show that has been held annually since 1975. Timbaland has received one award.

|-
| 2008 || "Give It to Me" || Favorite Hip-Hop Song ||

Teen Choice Awards
The Teen Choice Awards is an awards show presented annually by the Fox Broadcasting Company. Timbaland has received four awards from eight nominations.

|-
| 2003 || "Cry Me a River" || Choice Music Hook Up || 
|-
|rowspan="2"| 2006 ||rowspan="2"| "Promiscuous" || Choice Summer Track || 
|-
| Choice R&B/Hip-Hop Track || 
|-
|rowspan="4"| 2007 || "The Way I Are" || Choice Rap Track || 
|-
| "Give It to Me" || Choice Music Single || 
|-
|rowspan="2"| Timbaland || Choice Rap Artist || 
|-
| Choice Male Artist || 
|-
| 2010 || "If We Ever Meet Again" || Choice Music Hook Up ||

Vibe Awards
The Vibe Awards is an annual awards ceremony held on the UPN television network by Vibe. Timbaland has received one award.

|-
| 2007 || Timbaland || Producer of the Year ||

Webby Awards 
The Webby Award is an award for excellence on the Internet presented annually by The International Academy of Digital Arts and Sciences. Timbaland has received one award.

References

External links
 Official site for Timbaland

Timbaland
Awards